Walesboro is an unincorporated community in Wayne Township, Bartholomew County, in the U.S. state of Indiana.

History
A post office was established at Walesboro (also historically spelled Wailesborough, Wailesboro, and Waylesburg) in 1852, and it remained in operation until 1907. The community was named for its founder, John P. Wales.

Geography

The community is located on Indiana State Road 11 and is three miles east of Interstate 65.

Demographics

Walesboro has appeared in only one U.S. Census as a separately-returned community. In 1870, it was reported to have 101 inhabitants.

References

Unincorporated communities in Bartholomew County, Indiana
Unincorporated communities in Indiana